Yossi Asayag (born August 22, 1988) is an Israeli football player playing for F.C. Holon Yermiyahu.

Honours
 Third division (2):
2008–09 (Liga Artzit), 2016–17, 2018–19, 2020–21 (Liga Alef)

External links

1988 births
Israeli Jews
Living people
Israeli footballers
Sektzia Ness Ziona F.C. players
Hapoel Ra'anana A.F.C. players
Hapoel Ramat Gan F.C. players
Hapoel Acre F.C. players
Maccabi Yavne F.C. players
Hapoel Herzliya F.C. players
Hapoel Marmorek F.C. players
F.C. Kafr Qasim players
Nordia Jerusalem F.C. players
Hapoel Ashdod F.C. players
Hapoel Petah Tikva F.C. players
Shimshon Kafr Qasim F.C. players
F.C. Holon Yermiyahu players
Liga Leumit players
Israeli Premier League players
Israeli people of Moroccan-Jewish descent
Footballers from Ness Ziona
Association football forwards